Rezvy was one of 29 s (officially known as Project 7) built for the Soviet Navy during the late 1930s. Completed in 1940, she was assigned to the Pacific Fleet.

Design and description
Having decided to build the large and expensive   destroyer leaders, the Soviet Navy sought Italian assistance in designing smaller and cheaper destroyers.

Their crew numbered 197 officers and sailors in peacetime and 236 in wartime. The designers had been conservative in rating the turbines and many, but not all, of the ships handily exceeded their designed speed during their sea trials. Others fell considerably short of it, although specific figures for most individual ships have not survived.

As built, the Gnevny-class ships mounted four  B-13 guns in two pairs of superfiring single mounts fore and aft of the superstructure. Anti-aircraft defense was provided by a pair of  34-K AA guns in single mounts and a pair of  21-K AA guns as well as two  DK or DShK machine guns. They carried six  torpedo tubes in two rotating triple mounts; each tube was provided with a reload. The ships could also carry a maximum of either 60 or 95 mines and 25 depth charges. The ships were equipped with two K-1 paravanes intended to destroy mines and a pair of depth-charge throwers.

Construction and service 
Major components for the ship that became Rezvy were laid down at Shipyard No. 198 (Andre Marti South) in Nikolayev on 5 November 1935 as yard number 228 and were then railed to Vladivostok for completion at Shipyard No. 202 (Dalzavod) where the ship was laid down again on 23 August 1936. She was launched on 24 September 1937 and commissioned on 24 January 1940.

Citations

Sources

Further reading
 

Gnevny-class destroyers
1937 ships
Ships built in the Soviet Union
Cold War destroyers of the Soviet Union